Abu Havan-e Yek (also Romanized as Ābū Hāvan-e Yeḵ) is a village in Mollasani Rural District, in the Central District of Bavi County, Khuzestan Province, Iran. At the 2006 census, its population was 129, in 30 families. Most of its economy rests on farming.

References 

Populated places in Bavi County